Arthur Ernest Dillon (14 August 1894 – 10 January 1948) was an Australian rules footballer who played for the Collingwood Football Club in the Victorian Football League (VFL).

Notes

External links 

		
Artie Dillon's profile at Collingwood Forever

1894 births
1948 deaths
Australian rules footballers from South Australia
Collingwood Football Club players
West Torrens Football Club players